"Just Us" is a song by American producer DJ Khaled featuring American R&B singer SZA from Khaled's 2019 album Father of Asahd. It was serviced to contemporary hit radio on May 21, 2019 as the fourth single off the album. The song samples Outkast's "Ms. Jackson".

Critical reception
Thomas Hobbs of NME praised SZA's performance on the song and described it as "mixtape freestyle". A.D. Amorosi of Variety called the track "simmering" and stated that the song sounds out of place on a DJ Khaled album.

Music video
On April 15, 2019, Khaled first teased the video on his Instagram. The music video was released on May 17, 2019, along with a video of "Higher", which also appears on the album. It was directed by Joseph Kahn.

Use in media
The song was featured in the 2022 film Scream.

Charts

Weekly charts

Year-end charts

Certifications

Release history

References

2019 singles
2019 songs
DJ Khaled songs
SZA songs
Songs written by DJ Khaled
Songs written by SZA
Songs written by André 3000
Songs written by Big Boi
Songs written by Mr. DJ
Music videos directed by Joseph Kahn